Jean Fayolle (born 10 November 1937) is a French former long-distance runner who competed in track and cross country running. Born in Saint-Étienne, he became a member of ASPTT Paris and went on to represent France in the 5000 metres and 10,000 metres at the 1964 Tokyo Olympics. He was a four-time French national champion, winning titles in cross country, 3000 metres steeplechase, 5000 m and the 10,000 m in the 1960s.

His greatest achievement was a gold medal at the 1965 International Cross Country Championships. He led the French team to the silver medals alongside Michel Bernard and Michel Jazy. He was the last Frenchman to lift the title and his win marked the first French victory since the 1940s and 1950s wins by Alain Mimoun and Raphaël Pujazon. and He competed at the International Cross Country Championships four more times during the 1960s, including a team bronze with Bernard, Salah Beddiaf and Mimoun in 1961 and a team silver alongside Jean Vaillant, Yves Martinage, Mimoun and Lucien Rault in 1964. Despite his success in 1965, he did not feature in the top twenty of the race in his other outings.

Fayolle also competed at the 1963 Mediterranean Games and was a 5000 m silver medallist behind Mohammed Gammoudi. His personal bests on the track were 13.42.2 minutes for the 5000 m and 28.56.2 minutes for the 10,000 m. Both those times placed him in the top twenty of the seasonal rankings.

International competitions

National titles
French Athletics Championships
3000 m steeplechase: 1964
5000 m: 1964
10,000 m: 1966
French Cross Country Championships
Long race: 1964

References

External links

Image of Fayolle in 1965

Living people
1937 births
Sportspeople from Saint-Étienne
French male long-distance runners
French male steeplechase runners
Olympic athletes of France
Athletes (track and field) at the 1964 Summer Olympics
International Cross Country Championships winners
Mediterranean Games silver medalists for France
Athletes (track and field) at the 1963 Mediterranean Games
Mediterranean Games medalists in athletics
20th-century French people